The 2021–22 season was the 67th season in the existence of Real Sociedad B and the club's first season back in the second division of Spanish football since 1962.

Players

First-team squad

Reserve team

Out on loan

Transfers

In

Out

Pre-season and friendlies

Competitions

Overall record

Segunda División

League table

Results summary

Results by round

Matches
The league fixtures were announced on 30 June 2021.

References

Real Sociedad seasons
Real Sociedad B